Seydisuyu (also spelled Seydi Suyu) is a river in Eskişehir Province, Turkey. It is a branch of Sakarya. Çatören Dam is built on Seydisuyu. It also runs through the town of Doğançayır.

In popular culture
The river is mentioned in ’s 1967 book .

References

Bibliography

 
 
 
 

Rivers of Turkey
Landforms of Eskişehir Province